St Matthew Passion is a Passion setting composed by Johann Sebastian Bach in 1727 or 1729
 St Matthew Passion structure

St Matthew Passion may also refer to the following musical compositions:

 Passio Secundum Matthæum by Jacob Obrecht in 1471
 Passio Secundum Matthæum by Johann Walter, published in Neu Leipziger Gesangbuch, p. 179
 Passio Secundum Matthæum by Orlande de Lassus in 1575
 Matthäus-Passion, by Johannes Heroldt 1594
 Matthäus-Passion, by Heinrich Schütz in 1666
 Matthäus-Passion, 13 settings among Georg Philipp Telemann's Passions
 Matthäus-Passion, 6 settings among Carl Philipp Emanuel Bach's Passions
 Matthäus-Passion, several settings by Johann Heinrich Rolle
 Matthäuspassion (Homilius)
 Matthäus-Passion, by Johann Valentin Meder
 Matthäus-Passion, by Johann Christoph Rothe (1653-1700)
 Matthäus-Passion, by Christoph Demantius
 Matthäus-Passion, by Johann Sebastiani
 St Matthew Passion by Hilarion Alfeyev in 2006
 St Matthew Passion, by James MacMillan
 Passio Secundum Matthæum by Trond Hans Farner Kverno

It may also refer to:

 Saint Matthew Passion, a film by Tamás Czigány

See also 
 Gospel of Matthew
 Passion (Christianity)
 Passion (music)
 Passions (Bach)

de:Matthäus-Passion
nl:Matteüspassie